Jordan Malloch (born September 2, 1978) is an American sprint canoer who competed in the early to mid-2000s. He was eliminated in the heats of both the C-1 500 m and the C-1 1000 m events at the 2000 Summer Olympics in Sydney. Four years later in Athens, Malloch was eliminated in the semifinals of both the C-2 500 m and the C-2 1000 m events.

References
Sports-Reference.com profile

1978 births
American male canoeists
Canoeists at the 2000 Summer Olympics
Canoeists at the 2004 Summer Olympics
Living people
Olympic canoeists of the United States
Pan American Games medalists in canoeing
Pan American Games silver medalists for Canada
Medalists at the 1999 Pan American Games
Canoeists at the 1999 Pan American Games